Miss Grand Albania is an Albanian female beauty pageant founded in 2014 by a Pristina-based event organizer chaired by Sherif Pacolli, Lens Production. In 2018, the competition license was later transferred to the modeling agency managed by Aleks Tanushi, Aleks Fashion Events (A.F.E.), and its headquarters was also relocated to Tirana. The pageant winner represents the country at its international parent contest, Miss Grand International.

Since its first participation at the Miss Grand International pageant in 2014, Albania never got any placement at such an international contest.

History
Albania participated in the Miss Grand International pageant for the first time in 2014, represented by Vivian Canaj, who won the Miss Grand Albania 2014 title after competing at the Miss Grand Albania & Kosovo 2014 pageant held by Sherif Pacolli, a chairperson of the Kosovan event organizer in Pristina, Lens Production. The first edition of Albania's Miss Grand National was held on July 20, 2014, at the California Resort in Pristina; the event was broadcast live nationwide on a Kosovan satellite television channel, RTK Live, and featured twenty national finalists, of whom a model from Tirana, Vivian Canaj, was elected the winner.

From 2014 to 2018, the pageant was held in parallel with Miss Grand Kosovo as Miss Grand Albania & Kosovo, but after Aleks Tanushi of Aleks Fashion Events (A.F.E.) took over the Albanian franchise in 2018, the pageant has been held as a stand-alone pageant since then.

Editions
The following list is the edition detail of the Miss Grand Albania contest, held annually from 2014 to 2021.

Representatives at Miss Grand International

References

External links
 

Miss Grand Albania
Beauty pageants in Albania
Albanian awards
Recurring events established in 2014
2014 establishments in Albania